

Joseph von Radowitz (29 July 1899 – 31 May 1956) was a German general during World War II who may have been a recipient of the Knight's Cross of the Iron Cross with Oak Leaves. Radowitz joined the Bundeswehr in 1950s.

Awards and decorations
 Iron Cross (1914) 2nd Class (1917)
Clasp to the Iron Cross (1939) 2nd Class (6 October 1939) & 1st Class (26 June 1940)
 German Cross in Gold on 29 February 1944 as Oberst in Panzergrenadier-Regiment 28
 Knight's Cross of the Iron Cross with Oak Leaves
 Knight's Cross on 17 September 1944 as Oberst and leader of the 23. Panzer-Division
 (882nd) Oak Leaves on 9 May 1945 as Generalleutnant and commander of 23. Panzer-Division
Radowitz's nomination for the Oak Leaves was received by the Heerespersonalamt (HPA—Army Staff Office) from the troop on 30 April 1945 and approved by all intermittent commanding officers. Major Joachim Domaschk ruled that the nomination was insufficient and disapproved on 1 May and recommended "Decision by Chief of OKW". The file contains no indication whether this decision was ever taken. A teleprinter message was sent on 2 May to the nominating unit, the cavalry corps, and further messages to the commanding officers of the Panzer AOK 2 and Heeresgruppe Süd: "...was disapproved because ... the Führer criteria for the presentation guidelines have not been met. I.A. signed Maisel" The sequential number "882" was assigned by the Association of Knight's Cross Recipients (AKCR), the presentation date by Fellgiebel.

References

Citations

Bibliography

 
 
 
 

1899 births
1956 deaths
Lieutenant generals of the German Army (Wehrmacht)
German Army personnel of World War I
Recipients of the clasp to the Iron Cross, 2nd class
Recipients of the Gold German Cross
Recipients of the Knight's Cross of the Iron Cross with Oak Leaves
Military personnel from Frankfurt
People from Hesse-Nassau
Major generals of the German Army
German Army generals of World War II